Performance analysis may refer to:

 Performance attribution, a technique for analysing performance of funds in finance
 Profiling (computer programming), the analysis of computer performance